Fort Gordon, formerly known as Camp Gordon, is a United States Army installation established in October 1941. It is the current home of the United States Army Signal Corps, United States Army Cyber Command, and the Cyber Center of Excellence. It was once the home of The Provost Marshal General School and Civil Affairs School. The fort is located southwest of Augusta, Georgia. One of the major components of the installation is Advanced Individual Training for Signal Corps military occupational specialties. Signals Intelligence has become more visible and comprises more and more of the fort's duties. The installation was recommended for renaming to Fort Eisenhower by The Naming Commission. On 5 January 2023 William A. LaPlante, US under-secretary of defense for acquisition and sustainment (USD (A&S)) directed the full implementation of the recommendations of the Naming Commission, DoD-wide.

Etymology
It is named after John Brown Gordon, a major general in the Confederate army during the Civil War. Fort Gordon is one of the U.S. Army installations named for Confederate soldiers to be recommended for renaming by The Naming Commission. Their recommendation is that the post be renamed "Fort Eisenhower"; the renaming will occur in the fall of 2023.

History

World War I era

The United States Army established many war-training camps during World War I. Chamblee, northeast of Atlanta, was selected for one of the state's largest army cantonments. It was named Camp Gordon in honor of John Brown Gordon, who was a major general in the Confederate army, a Georgia governor, a U.S. senator, and a businessman. The camp opened in July 1917, becoming a training site and home of the famous 82nd Division. The division was composed of men from several different states, but men from Georgia made up almost half its number. Among the men trained at Camp Gordon, during that period, was the future Congressional Medal of Honor recipient Alvin York. This camp was in operation until the sale of real estate and buildings was ordered in 1920. It was abandoned in September 1921. During WWI the US Army Camp Hancock was located in Augusta, Georgia in the general vicinity of the current Daniel Field. Camp Hancock was the home of the 28th Infantry Division from Pennsylvania. Camp Hancock was abandoned and turned over to a caretaker detachment 27 March 1919. From 1919 until 1941, there was no army installation named Camp Gordon in existence, nor was there an installation located near Augusta, Georgia.

The 157th Depot Brigade was located at Camp Gordon, which received,  organized and equipped troops in preparation for further assignments. The unit also received returning troops from war time service and completed their out processing and discharges.

Camp Gordon fielded football teams in 1917 and 1918 that competed in those NCAA college football seasons.

World War II era

Camp Gordon was approved as the name for a WWII division training camp which began construction in July 1941. The U.S. War Department approved a contract to construct facilities on a new training area near Augusta, in Richmond County, Georgia that had been selected several months earlier. A groundbreaking and flag-raising ceremony took place in October. In response to the attack on Pearl Harbor Colonel Herbert W. Schmidt, camp commander, moved his small staff from his temporary office in the Augusta post office building to the unfinished headquarters building at Camp Gordon on 9 December 1941 and the 4th Infantry Division began to establish operations there.

The post was home to three divisions during the war; the 4th Infantry, the 26th Infantry, and the 10th Armored. From October 1943 to January 1945 Camp Gordon served as an internment camp for foreign prisoners of war. From May 1945 until April 1946 the U.S. Army Personnel and Separation Center processed nearly 86,000 personnel for discharge from the Army.

Post-World War II

From early 1946 to June 1947, the U.S. Army Disciplinary Barracks for convicted criminals was located at Camp Gordon, and the installation was scheduled for deactivation. In September 1948 the Army relocated the Military Police School from Carlisle Barracks, Pennsylvania, to Camp Gordon, and in October 1948 a Signal Corps training center was activated.

On 21 March 1956, the post was renamed Fort Gordon.

During the Vietnam War, Fort Gordon was home to Camp Crockett, an area of the post conducting 9-week advance airborne infantry training courses for soldiers in line to attend the remaining 3 weeks of Airborne training at Fort Benning, Georgia, and then be assigned to Airborne units in Vietnam. The location closed as the war ended and today the site is overgrown with pine trees. Between 1966 and 68, approximately 2,200 Signal Officers were trained at Fort Gordon's Signal Officer Candidate School (OCS), before all US Army branch OCSs were merged with the Infantry OCS at Fort Benning. Until 1974 Fort Gordon was also a training location for the Military Police Corps, located in the World War II wooden barracks corridor between Brainard Ave. and Avenue of the States, and in the Brems Barracks area of the fort.

During the 1950s and into the 1970s Fort Gordon served as a basic training facility under the US Third Army. In 1974 the Army moved its main Signal School from Fort Monmouth NJ to Fort Gordon to consolidate all signal training in one location. The activity was designated the US Army Signal Center and Fort Gordon. At the same time, the Army moved the MP School to Fort McClellan AL and the Civil Affairs School to Fort Bragg NC. Since June 1986 Fort Gordon has been the home of the Signal Corps Regiment, the branch of the U.S. Army responsible for providing and maintaining information systems and communication networks. The US Army Signal School's primary purpose is to conduct specialized instruction for all Signal Corps military and civilian personnel. During the 1990s the post served as a home for deployable Signal and Military Intelligence units as well. The other major activity was health care, to include a Dental Lab along with a major Army Hospital, Dwight D. Eisenhower Medical Center. Fort Gordon is a diversified post where army Signal, Military Intelligence, Medical and now Cyber are housed. The senior mission partner however remains the US Army Cyber Center of Excellence.

In September 2014, the US Army established the US Army Cyber branch and Cyber School at Fort Gordon. Both the Signal School and Cyber School are subordinate elements of the US Army Cyber Center of Excellence, the headquarters which was formerly known as the US Army Signal Center of Excellence. The chiefs of the Signal and Cyber branches - the Chief of Signal and the Chief of Cyber - are dual hatted as the commandants of their respective schools and serve as the proponent chiefs for their branches and regiments.

In October 2016, Fort Gordon marked its 75th year as a continuous active US military installation near Augusta, GA. In 2018, the Installation Management Command became part of the Army Material Command and the installation facilities now belongs to AMC, with the TRADOC Cyber Center of Excellence commander serving as the senior mission partner in addition to his TRADOC duties of education and training.

Units and facilities

Fort Gordon's official name is the U.S. Army Cyber Center of Excellence & Fort Gordon, or CyberCoE&FG. While the TRADOC school itself is a major function, the post is home to the following active-duty tenant units:
United States Army Cyber Command
Cyber Protection Brigade
780th Military Intelligence Brigade (located at Fort Meade, MD)
782nd Military Intelligence Battalion
 915 Cyber Warfare Battalion
 B Company
15th Signal Brigade
369th Signal Battalion
442nd Signal Battalion
551st Signal Battalion
Ordnance Training Detachment - Gordon
Cyber Training Battalion
35th Signal Brigade
50th Expeditionary Signal Battalion (located at Fort Bragg, NC)
51st Expeditionary Signal Battalion (located at Joint Base Lewis–McChord, WA) 
63rd Expeditionary Signal Battalion
67th Expeditionary Signal Battalion) located at Fort Stewart, GA)
480th Intelligence, Surveillance and Reconnaissance Wing USAF
513th Military Intelligence Brigade
202nd Military Intelligence Battalion
297th Military Intelligence Battalion
35th Military Police Detachment
706th Military Intelligence Group
707th Military Intelligence Battalion
7th Signal Command
359th Signal Brigade (USAR)
92nd Engineers Combat Heavy
206th Military Intelligence Battalion
31st Intelligence Squadron
324th Signal Battalion
Cryptologic Support Battalion
338th Training Squadron (USAF)
National Security Agency/Central Security Service Georgia, formerly known as the Gordon Regional Security Operations Center. 
Naval Network Warfare Command (Navy Information Operations Command, Georgia), 
Marine Corps Intelligence Activity  
Dwight D. Eisenhower Army Medical Center (DDEAMC)

Fort Gordon has approximately 30,000 military and civilian employees and currently has an estimated $1.1 billion economic impact on the Augusta-Richmond County economy.

Training and current activities 
Fort Gordon is home to the US Army Signal and Cyber Schools. The Signal school focuses primarily on communications technology that is currently being utilized by the United States Army to provide the DODIN or Department of Defense Information Network, the platform for cyberspace operations. One MOS or Military Operational Specialty that is currently being trained at Fort Gordon by the Signal School are the Signal Support System Specialists whose MOS designation is 25U or 25 Uniform. Soldiers that can perform both Signal and Cyber related jobs are in high demand throughout the army and because of this Fort Gordon has a steady stream of soldiers training on base in those disciplines.

Future activities and facilities

Due to increases in the need and use of cyber technology the US Army decided to consolidate the United States Army Cyber Command into one location. Fort Gordon along with Fort George Meade were in the running to receive the command. In December 2013 it was announced that Fort Gordon was selected.

Berlin Wall display

In Freedom Park, located off Rice Road, across from Barton Field, is a display of two sections of the Berlin Wall, as well as a sign from the wall.

Proposed renaming
On May 24, 2022, the Commission on the Naming of Items of the Department of Defense that Commemorate the Confederate States of America or Any Person Who Served Voluntarily with the Confederate States of America submitted a recommendation to Congress that Fort Gordon be renamed to Fort Eisenhower, in commemoration of General of the Army Dwight D. Eisenhower.

See also
 Cyber quest

References

External links

 
 Fort Gordon Pictorial History Book
 WW1 account of Life at Camp Gordon"Letters from Ward B Scripture of the 328th Infantry to his Mother during WW1"
 "NSA Seeks to Pour Hundreds of Millions Into Surveillance Infrastructure," The Peacock Report, April 20, 2006
 Dwight D. Eisenhower Army Medical Center
 CSRA Alliance for Fort Gordon – Group that sought to keep Fort Gordon open during the 2005 Base Realignment and Closure round
 U.S. Army Signal Corps OCS Association
 Fort Gordon Directorate of Morale, Welfare and Recreation
 New Georgia Encyclopedia information 
 Battle Command Battle Lab
 Camp Gordon historical marker
 Columbia County CVB official website

Gordon
Training installations of the United States Army
Military intelligence collection
Gordon
Military installations in Georgia (U.S. state)
Buildings and structures in Augusta, Georgia
Economy of Augusta, Georgia
Buildings and structures in Richmond County, Georgia
Buildings and structures in Jefferson County, Georgia
Buildings and structures in McDuffie County, Georgia
Buildings and structures in Columbia County, Georgia
1941 establishments in Georgia (U.S. state)
Military installations established in 1941